Betty Boop's Museum is a 1932 Fleischer Studios animated short film starring Betty Boop, and featuring Koko the Clown and Bimbo.

Plot
Koko is recruiting customers for a 50-cent sightseeing tour of the museum. Betty is Koko's only passenger. Betty gets locked inside by accident. The skeletons from the displays come to life and chase Betty, until she is finally rescued by Bimbo.

References

External links

 Betty Boop's Museum at IMDB
 Betty Boop's Museum at the Big Cartoon Database
 Betty Boop's Museum on YouTube

1932 films
American black-and-white films
Betty Boop cartoons
1930s American animated films
1932 animated films
Paramount Pictures short films
Fleischer Studios short films
Short films directed by Dave Fleischer
Films set in museums
1930s English-language films